Winchester High School is a comprehensive 9–12 high school located in Winchester, Massachusetts, United States. Founded in 1850, it moved into its current location in the spring of 1972. Ranked 16th among Massachusetts High Schools, close to 98% of students graduated in 2016, with about 96% of those continuing to higher education.

A major three-phase reconstruction and expansion of the school started in 2014 and was completed in September 2017. Most of the school was rebuilt using the original structural frame.  After the complete redesign of the interior of the building, approximately 75% of classrooms now have exterior windows and direct day-lighting versus 25% in 1972. The original internal courtyard was enclosed to create the 2-story dining commons and assembly space.  Winchester High School remained in use during construction.

Sports
Winchester High School fields teams in the following sports:

Notable alumni

Joe Bellino, (Class of '56) Halfback, Heisman Trophy winner in 1960 while at Navy.  He also played with the Boston Patriots from 1965–67.
Pat Badger, (Class of '85) Bassist of the band Extreme
Bob Bigelow, (Class of '71), College and NBA Basketball Player (University of Pennsylvania, Kansas City Kings, Boston Celtics)
 Janet Doub Erickson (graphic artist and author, founder of the Blockhouse of Boston)
Glen Doherty, (Class of '88) Navy SEAL killed in 2012 Benghazi Attack working for a contracted CIA group.
Tony Fryklund, (Class of '89) current professional mixed martial arts fighter, formerly competing for Bellator MMA, the WEC, Strikeforce (mixed martial arts), and the UFC
Wally Gagel, (Class of '81) Music Producer
Art Johnson, former MLB player (Boston Braves)
Brian Keefe, (Class of ‘94) current professional NBA basketball assistant coach
Kofi Kingston, (Class of '99) WWE Wrestler
Laurence Owen, while a student at Winchester High School, was the 1961 U. S. Ladies and North American Figure Skating Champion and placed 6th in the 1960 Winter Olympics in the same event. She appeared on the cover of Sports Illustrated magazine, under the caption "America's Most Exciting Girl Skater". On February 15, 1961, she died at age 16 along with her mother, Maribel Vinson-Owen, sister Maribel Owen and 16 other members of the U.S. Figure Skating Team near Brussels, Belgium, in a plane crash while en route to the World Figure Skating Championship in Prague, Czechoslovakia.
Alicia Sacramone (Class of '06) won a Silver Medal at the 2008 Summer Olympics in the Artistic Gymnastics Team All-Around Competition. 10 time World Championship medalist (making her the most decorated American gymnast of all time), 19 time National medalist, and 5 time U.S. Vault Champion. Sacramone placed 4th in the 2008 Olympic vault event finals. 
Dan Spang, (Class of '02) Professional Hockey Player
Richard Phillips, (Class of '73) Captain of the Maersk Alabama when it was attacked by Somali pirates in April, 2009.
Bjorn Poonen, (Class of '85) World-renowned mathematician
Alison Hersey Risch, (Class of '54) Captain of US Women's Lacrosse team 1964, Member of the US Field Hockey HOF and the US Lacrosse HOF.
Levni Yilmaz, Creator of Tales of Mere Existence

References

Schools in Middlesex County, Massachusetts
Public high schools in Massachusetts